Shelbourne Football Club is an Irish association football club based in Drumcondra, Dublin, who play in the League of Ireland Premier Division.

Shelbourne were founded in Dublin in 1895. In 1904 the club joined the Irish Football League, which was then an all Ireland competition, before becoming founding members of the League of Ireland in 1921. Shelbourne have won the league 13 times and are one of three clubs to have won both the IFA Cup and the FAI Cup. They play their home matches at Tolka Park, in the Dublin suburb of Drumcondra. The club colours are primarily red and white, with home jerseys being predominantly red. "Shels" is the club's most common nickname, an abbreviation of Shelbourne.

In the 2004/05 European season, Shelbourne became the first Irish club to reach the third qualifying round of the UEFA Champions League. Their performances in European competition and former striker Jason Byrne being capped for the Republic of Ireland whilst with the club, gained Shelbourne international exposure. The club lost their Premier Division licence for the 2007 season due to the club's debt situation. Although the club was saved, since then, Shelbourne have mainly played in the second tier of the League of Ireland.

History

Formation & IFA years: 1895–1920
Shelbourne Football Club was formed in 1895 in the Ringsend area of Dublin by a group of men led by James Rowan. The club took its name from the nearby Shelbourne Road. The club's first pitch was at Havelock Square just behind the north stand at the present day Aviva Stadium.

Shelbourne's second season was their first in competitive competition. Shelbourne played 28 matches, won 25, drew 2 and lost only 1. Their goal tally was 109 for and 15 against. Shelbourne won the principal junior competitions, the Leinster Junior Cup and League Championship. The club decided to enter the senior ranks for the 1897–98 Season and reached the Leinster Senior Cup Final at their first attempt, only to lose to Bohemians. They also finished runners-up in the Leinster Senior League. The club won their first Leinster Senior Cup in 1899/1900, Shelbourne won the competition again in 1901 and 1904.

The club made it into the final of the IFA Cup in 1905 but were beaten by Distillery. The following year Shelbourne defeated Belfast Celtic in the Cup Final 2–0 and became the first Southern club to win the IFA Cup, according to a Dublin newspaper "Tar Barrels and bonfires were blazing across Ringsend and Sandymount that night as the Irish Cup was paraded around the district". In 1906 Shelbourne player Val Harris became the club's first player to line out for Ireland. In 1906 Shelbourne won their fourth Leinster Senior Cup, the club also played in a charity match against Bohemians in 1906 and raised more than 100 pounds to build a Roman Catholic Church in Ringsend. Shelbourne reached the IFA Cup Final again in 1907 and 1908 but were beaten on both occasion in replays against Cliftonville and Bohemians. In 1907 Shelbourne were also Irish Football League runners-up to Linfield. They won the Leinster Senior Cup again in 1908 and 1909. In 1909 Shelbourne were City Cup winners and finished 3rd place in the Irish Football League, behind champions Linfield and Glentoran. In 1911 Shelbourne won the IFA Cup for their second time. Shelbourne won the Leinster Senior Cup again in 1913 and 1914. Shelbourne were 1914 Gold Cup runners-up, and then winners in 1915. Shelbourne were Leinster Senior Cup winners again in 1917 and 1919. Shelbourne won the IFA Cup once more, in 1920 after the other semi-final was declared void as both of the teams involved were ejected from the competition (Belfast Celtic and Glentoran), before Shelbourne's association with the Irish Football Association was to come to an end.

Establishment of the League of Ireland: 1921–1929
Additional reading: IFA#North-South Split

Following the Anglo-Irish Treaty, Partition of Ireland and establishment of the Irish Free State, the League of Ireland was formed for clubs in the 26 counties of Ireland that had not remained part of the United Kingdom. The immediate cause of the split lay in a bitter dispute over the venue for the replay of an Irish Cup match in 1921 involving Glentoran of Belfast and Shelbourne. When the first cup match was drawn in Belfast, because of the Irish war of independence, the IFA reneged on a promise to play the replay in Dublin and scheduled the rematch again for Belfast. Shelbourne refused to comply and forfeited the Cup.  Such was the anger over the issue that the Leinster FA broke away from the IFA and formed its own national association, the present-day Football Association of Ireland. Shelbourne became one of the original League of Ireland founder clubs along with Bohemians, St James's Gate, Jacobs, Olympia, Frankfort, Dublin United and YMCA.

In the opening 1921–22 Season, Shelbourne finished 3rd place behind winners St James's Gate and Bohemians. Shelbourne finished runners-up the following two seasons and won the 1924 Leinster Senior Cup, the reds finished third in the league again in the 1924–25 season before winning the league for their first time the following season in 1925–26. They finished runners-up the following two years before winning the 1928–29 Championship.

Thirties: 1930–1939
Additional reading: Reds United
Having failed to retain the title in 1930, Shels won their third league title in 1931 and were Leinster Senior Cup winners. In 1934 the club got into a dispute with the Free State F.A. when they looked for compensation when the FAIFS arranged a match for the same day as Shelbourne had a match scheduled. In the row that followed, Shels resigned from the League and were then suspended from football for a year by the FAI. The club played no football during the 1934–35 season and spent the 1935–36 season in the Athletic Union League before being re-admitted to the League of Ireland for the start of the 1936–37 season. During the 1935–36 season a team called Reds United, made up of a number of Shels players and backed by Shels personnel, competed in the League of Ireland and finished a respectable fourth. At the end of the season, they resigned from the League to make way for Shels return.

The decade had a happy ending though as success in the FAI Cup finally arrived (many fans had started to believe the club was suffering from a curse). It was in the 1939 cup final that the supposed curse was broken. Sligo Rovers who boasted Dixie Dean, the goalscoring legend of the Football League, were eventually beaten after a replay thanks to a long-range goal from 'Sacky' Glen. After so many attempts, the blue ribbon of Irish football made its way to Shelbourne Park for the first time. Official figures put the attendances at 30,000 and 25,000 for the first final and the replay respectively.

Forties: 1940–1949
As the euphoria of the first FAI Cup success wore off, the forties started slowly enough for the Reds, and it wasn't until 1944 that the league championship was won again-for a fourth time, along with the Shield. The title was clinched after an epic 5–3 win over local rivals Shamrock Rovers. Luck was reversed though in the FAI Cup Final as Rovers stopped the Reds from winning the treble. Shels went down 3–2 but felt aggrieved that the referee award them a penalty when it seemed a Rovers defender had handled the ball after it went over the goal-line. The subsequent penalty was missed. Shels won another Leinster Senior Cup in 1946.

Another league title, however, was wrapped up on the last day in 1947 and was again secured against Shamrock Rovers.

The closing of the decade marked the end of an era. In April 1949, Shels drew 2–2 against Waterford in what was the club's final competitive game at Shelbourne Park. The plan was that Shels would build a new stadium in Ringsend. The 1948–49 season also saw Shels win their seventh Shield and fourteenth Leinster Senior Cup.

Fifties: 1950–1959
In 1951, Shels made it to the FAI Cup final where they met Cork Athletic who had already wrapped up the league. Tommy Carberry had scored in every round for the Reds and did so again in the final, played in front of over 38,900 fans, but it was only good enough to earn a replay which Athletic won. A sixth league title was won in 1953, and then in 1955–56 Shels played their only season in Irishtown Stadium. The ground, however, was far from complete despite a huge amount of voluntary work being carried out by supporters and offered no shelter for the fans from the elements. Shels were tenants at Tolka Park the following season.

During that season Gerry Doyle was appointed manager and a new era was being ushered in for the Reds. The FAI Youth Cup was won in 1959 and Doyle was true to his word, "if they're good enough, they're old enough" and six of the Youth Cup-winning team became first-team regulars. Amongst them was Tony Dunne who would be later transferred to Manchester United with whom he picked up a European Cup winners medal in 1968.

Sixties: 1960–1969
Additional reading: Shelbourne F.C. in Europe
The early years of the sixties went great for the Reds. Three goal wins over Bohemians, Shamrock Rovers and Dundalk put Shelbourne in the 1960 FAI Cup Final where they beat Cork Hibernians 2–0 to get their hands on the trophy for only the second time. Cork Celtic were beaten by a Ben Hannigan goal in a play-off for the league in 1962 and only illness to three key players as a result of vaccinations taken on a League of Ireland representative trip to Italy cost Shelbourne the FAI Cup and a first 'double' as they went down to Shamrock Rovers in the final despite being red-hot favourites. The FAI Cup was however won the following year and it was a repeat of the 1960 final. A 2–0 win over Cork Hibs.

With this success came the excitement of European club football, Shelbourne played their first European match against Sporting Clube de Portugal in 1962, they were beaten 2–0 in the first leg held at Dalymount Park and then 5–1 in Portugal to go out 7–1 on aggregate. The following season they took on FC Barcelona in the European Cup Winners' Cup but were beaten 5–1 on aggregate. In 1963 Shelbourne won another Leinster Senior Cup. In 1964 the club finally sold their last interest in Irishtown Stadium. Shelbourne won their first European game & tie in the 1964–65 Inter-Cities Fairs Cup, after the first leg resulted in a 0–0 draw and the second leg finished 1–1, Shelbourne won a playoff match against Portuguese side Belenenses, the following round they were eliminated 2–0 on aggregate by Atlético Madrid. On 19 November 1967 in a match between Shelbourne and rivals Bohemians, Shelbourne player Jimmy O'Connor set the record for the world's fastest hat-trick in top tier domestic league history. O'Connor scored three goals in 2 minutes and 13 seconds in Dalymount Park. Shelbourne won the Leinster Senior Cup in 1968. In the years that followed, televised highlights of English football began to be broadcast into Ireland and the crowds around most of the league grounds plummeted. Clubs in the league came under huge financial pressure, players left for England at a younger age, grounds became derelict, and media coverage almost disappeared.

Decline in the seventies and eighties: 1970–1989
There was a bright enough start to the seventies as Athlone Town were beaten in the Shield final second replay, a win that would see the Reds enter the new UEFA Cup the following season. However, it was to be the last trophy the club would win for some time apart from their Leinster Senior Cup win in 1972. Cork Hibs beat Shels in the replay of the 1973 FAI Cup Final in Flower Lodge-the only time the final was ever played outside Dublin while Shelbourne were eliminated from the UEFA Cup by Hungarians Vasas SC in what would be their last European game for 21 years. Two years later Shels were shocked in the Cup final by amateurs Home Farm. During this time the club's ongoing problems were covered in a ground-breaking RTÉ fly on the wall documentary entitled In My Book You Should Be Ahead. In 1978, Jimmy Johnstone, a European Cup winner with Celtic in 1967 signed briefly for the club. 'Jinky' only played 9 games for the Reds and the European Cup winner failed to score in any of his appearances.

In 1984, Shels lost out to Shamrock Rovers in the FAI Cup semi-final replay. As the league was to expand to two divisions in the summer of 1985, the bottom four clubs at the end of the 1984/85 season were to be relegated. Needing a win on the last day of the season, Shels found themselves two down at half-time away to Galway United. However, a heroic comeback ensued and Shels got the three goals to take the points and avoid the drop. But the reprieve only lasted twelve months as Shelbourne were relegated on Goal Difference after finishing level on 13 points with Cork but on −25 goal difference compared to Cork's −21. Shels stay in the First Division was short-lived as they came back up straight away with Derry City. After two decades and more in the doldrums, the grey skies were clearing. Tony Donnelly took over the club in 1989 and started to invest heavily. Shels were out of the derelict Harold's Cross Stadium and taking over Tolka Park. Former Irish international Pat Byrne was installed as player-manager, and a plethora of new players arrived shortly after to bring back the glory days.

Return to success: 1990–1999
Additional reading: Shelbourne F.C. in Europe
The heavy investment in the club by the Donnelly family gave an almost instant return as Shels captured their eighth league title at the end of the 1991/92 season – the first for thirty years – when they won 3–1 away to outgoing champions Dundalk. Despite only needing a draw, Brian Flood sealed the win with a spectacular goal from thirty-five yards. Although the league title was lost the following season after two series of play-offs involving Cork City and Bohemians, the FAI Cup was won, again after a thirty-year wait, when a Greg Costello header was enough to defeat Dundalk in Lansdowne Road. The club made a return to European competitions after a 21-year wait in 1992 when they faced Ukrainian club SC Tavriya Simferopol in the newly formed UEFA Champions League, despite holding the Ukrainians to a scoreless draw in Dublin they were beaten 2–1 in Ukraine and eliminated from the competition. the following season Shelbourne won their first game in Europe for 30 years when they beat FC Karpaty Lviv of Ukraine, They advanced to play Greek Giants Panathinaikos and were beaten 5–1 on aggregate. Later that season the Reds won yet another Leinster Senior Cup.

Two seasons later they were hammered 6–0 on aggregate by Icelandic club ÍA Akraness in the UEFA Cup, the previous season they finished third in the league and just two points behind winners Dundalk. Both the League Cup and the FAI Cup were won in sensational circumstances in 1996 under Damien Richardson. The League Cup was won, for the first time, in a penalty shootout against Sligo Rovers after Shels had come from two down late on. In the FAI Cup Final against St. Patrick's, Shels were reduced early on to ten men as keeper Alan Gough was sent off, and with no sub keeper, midfielder Brian Flood played seventy minutes in goal. Despite trailing 1–0, Tony Sheridan equalised with a stunning lob in the last couple of minutes to force a replay. With Alan Gough back in goal for the rematch, Shels won the trophy after Gough saved a late penalty and Stephen Geoghegan scored an even later winner. Shels became only the third club to retain the FAI Cup when they defeated Derry City 2–0 in the 1997 final. Shelbourne fell to SK Brann in the 1996–97 UEFA Cup Winners' Cup Preliminary round.

The 1997/98 season brought heartbreak. Shels lost the League Cup Final to Sligo Rovers, the FAI Cup Final to Cork City after a replay, and worst of all, missed out on the league title on the last day of the season, they were also narrowly eliminated from the UEFA Cup Winners' Cup by Kilmarnock. Richardson departed after this failure and in stepped the uncompromising Dermot Keely. Keely's first season ended in disappointment, Shelbourne finished third in the league and were knocked out of the FAI Cup at the Semifinal stage. In the first Qualifying round of the 1998–99 UEFA Cup Shelbourne were drawn against Glasgow side & one of the Old Firm teams, Rangers. Due to security concerns Shelbourne's home leg was moved to Prenton Park in Tranmere. Despite leading the 1st leg in Tranmere 3–0, Shelbourne were beaten 5–3 and later beaten 2–0 in the second leg. In the 1999 UEFA Intertoto Cup Shelbourne were beaten in the first round by Swiss club Neuchâtel Xamax.

Glory years, European success & financial implosion: 2000–2006
Additional reading: Shelbourne F.C. Seasons
Additional reading: Shelbourne F.C. in Europe
After a mediocre first season, Dermot Keely brought Shels a historic first-ever League and FAI Cup double in 1999–2000. Having secured the league with a 2–0 win in Waterford which saw Shels lose just once before then, the double was claimed thanks to a Pat Fenlon goal in the FAI Cup final replay away in Dalymount Park against Bohemians. The following season though saw Shels again let the league title slip away on the last day. Shelbourne beat Macedonian club FK Sloga Jugomagnat to set up a tie with Rosenborg BK, Shelbourne were eliminated by the Norwegians 4–2 on aggregate. The 2001–02 season was dogged in controversy as title challengers St Patrick's Athletic were docked nine points for fielding an unregistered player in accordance with the league's rules, before having them restored. The league eventually docked them fifteen points when it emerged a second unregistered player had played five games. This all led to Shels claiming their tenth league title, in the same season Shelbourne were eliminated from the UEFA Cup in the preliminary round by Danish club Brøndby.

Under new manager Pat Fenlon the title was missed out on in 2002–03 and Shelbourne were knocked out embarrassingly in the 2002–03 UEFA Champions League First qualifying round by Minnows Hibernians from Malta, but for the first time ever, Shels won back-to-back titles in 2003 and 2004 as the league changed to a summer season. They were eliminated from the 2003–04 UEFA Cup in the opening round of games in the competition by Slovenians NK Olimpija Ljubljana. Shelbourne entered the 2004–05 UEFA Champions League qualifying rounds in the first round. After beating KR Reykjavík they advanced to face the then Croatian League Champions HNK Hajduk Split, after the first leg in Croatia Shelbourne were trailing 3–2, however thanks to a 2–0 victory at home Shelbourne advanced 4–3 on aggregate, Shelbourne became the first Irish club to reach the third qualifying round of the UEFA Champions League and managed to pull off one of the biggest upsets in European Competitions caused by an Irish Club. However, Shelbourne's historic Champions League run came to an end when they were beaten by Spanish club, Deportivo La Coruña 3–0 on aggregate, having achieved a 0–0 draw in Lansdowne Road in front of 25,000 fans. That season the club also set a record for the longest European run in Irish history, a record they held for seven more seasons. After the Champions League exit at the hands of Deportivo the club was entered into the UEFA Cup. There, Shels met French side Lille and were beaten 4–2 on aggregate, having come back from a two-goal deficit in Lansdowne Road to achieve a credible draw thanks to a brace from substitute Glen Fitzpatrick. Shelbourne went on to win the League in 2004. Having just failed to make the group stages of the Champions League & UEFA Cup in 2004, Shels brought in big-name players for the 2005 season, but only finished third in the league and lost to Linfield in the first-ever Setanta Cup Final at Tolka Park, after beating Glentoran in the first qualifying round of the Champions League they were knocked out 4–1 on aggregate by Romanian club Steaua Bucharest, despite holding the Romanian side to a 0–0 draw in the first leg at Tolka Park.

2006 saw a change in fortunes for Shelbourne, with 'The Reds' winning the title on the last day of the season on goal difference from the old Derry City, they also managed to reach the Intertoto Cup semi-finals in the Northern Region after beating Lithuanian club FK Vėtra 5–0 on aggregate, the largest victory in European Competitions for Shelbourne, but they were knocked out of the competition by Danish side Odense BK 3–1 on aggregate, 'The Reds' had been beaten 3–0 in the first leg at Fionia Park in Odense but earned a very respectable 1–0 win at Tolka Park, remaining undefeated at home in Europe for 8 games, an Irish record. In 2006 Shelbourne also reached the League of Ireland Cup final for the first time since 1998 but lost on penalties. In 2006 Shelbourne became a member of the 'European Club Forum'.

However, after ongoing financial problems for Shelbourne during the 2006 season, Pat Fenlon resigned as manager and the vast majority of players left, some for rival clubs, others to British clubs.

Demotion to the second tier: 2007–2011
Additional reading: Shelbourne F.C. Seasons
Shels withdrew from the 2007 Setanta Sports Cup and before the start of the new league season were demoted to the First Division by the FAI. Shelbourne announced on 29 March 2007 that they would not be applying for a UEFA licence to compete in the 2007–08 UEFA Champions League qualifying rounds. The club's majority shareholder Oliver Byrne suffered a brain tumour (he died in August 2007) and Joe Casey was installed as chairman. Former manager Dermot Keely was brought back in and assembled a squad just in time for the club to take its place in the 2007 League of Ireland First Division. A respectable 5th-place finish in the top half of the table was secured. In the 2008 campaign, they were odds-on favourites to win the First Division but a last minute goal by Limerick 37 in Tolka Park gave Dundalk the division and the accompanying promotion. In 2008 the club left the disbanded European Club Forum and joined its replacement, the European Club Association. In 2009, the chance for promotion evaporated when Shels lost 1–2 at home to Sporting Fingal in the promotion/relegation play-off semi-final. In 2009 Shelbourne left the European Club Association. In 2010 former Reds player Alan Mathews became the new manager. Under Matthews, Shelbourne won the 2010 Leinster Senior Cup, later that year Shelbourne narrowly missed out on a place in the Promotion Play-offs thanks to a 2–1 defeat at home to Waterford United on the final day of the season.

2011 was a year of mixed fortunes for Shelbourne, a change in the promotion rules allowing the First Division Champions & Runners-up both automatic promotion provided to be beneficial for Shelbourne. 'The Reds' clinched promotion back to the Premier Division thanks to 4–0 home victory against Finn Harps on 25 October. 2011 was also a memorable Cup year for Shelbourne, they were drawn to play Sheriff Y.C. in the fourth round, despite leading the game by two goals Shelbourne were beaten by Sheriff 3–2, however, Sheriff were subsequently found to have fielded an ineligible player and were ejected from the cup. Shelbourne were subsequently admitted to the Quarterfinals. After victories over Limerick in the Quarterfinals and St Patrick's Athletic in a Semifinal replay they secured a place in the 2011 FAI Cup Final, where they were beaten 4–1 on Penalties by Sligo Rovers after the game finished 1–1 after extra time.

Brief return to the top-flight, First Division: 2012–2019
Additional reading: Shelbourne F.C. Seasons

2012 saw Shelbourne finish eight out of eleven teams on their return to the Premier Division. The club also reached the Cup semi-finals, losing to Derry in a Replay at Tolka Park. However Shelbourne stayed in the top flight for just two seasons, with 'the Reds' finishing bottom of the 2013 Premier Division Alan Matthews was replaced by Johnny McDonnell as manager on 24 May 2013. The 2014 season saw Shelbourne finish second in the First Division, the club thus advanced to a promotion playoff against Galway United. Galway won the two-legged tie, and Shels remained in the First Division. At the end of the 2014 campaign, McDonnell left to manage Drogheda United and was replaced by Kevin Doherty. The 2015 season saw the club finish fourth in the league. A disappointing 2016 campaign ended in a sixth-place finish. Former player Owen Heary took over as manager midway through the season following the resignation of Kevin Doherty. In 2017, Heary's first full season as manager ended in a fourth-place league finish. In 2018, the team qualified for a promotion playoff after a third-place finish. Shels lost in the first round to Drogheda over two legs. In 2019, however, Shelbourne would regain promotion to the Premier Division for the first time since 2013 by winning the first division. They claimed the title with a 3–1 away win over Drogheda at United Park on 14 September 2019.

Return to the Premier Division, relegation and promotion: 2020–21 

In 2020, Shelbourne competed in the Premier Division for the first time since 2013. They were condemned to the First Division once again at the end of the 2020 via a promotion/relegation playoff, but secured a return after winning promotion and the 2021 First Division championship on 1 October 2021.

Stadium
Additional reading: Tolka Park

In 1989 Shelbourne acquired the lease on Tolka Park from Dublin Corporation. Before moving to Drumcondra Shels had most recently been based in Harold's Cross Stadium, earlier they had been housed in Shelbourne Park, Irishtown Stadium and Dalymount Park. Shels had played home games regularly in Tolka during the fifties, sixties, seventies, and early eighties. Before Tolka Park was home to Shelbourne it housed Drumcondra F.C. from 1953 until 1972 when Drumcondra unexpectedly went out of business, vacating the ground. Home Farm were the next tenants in Tolka Park however the club never drew large crowds. When Shelbourne moved into the ground they invested heavily in the stadium, converting it into Ireland's first all-seater stadium and building a new stand behind the Drumcondra end goal in 1999. The first-ever League of Ireland match to be broadcast live on TV was a fixture between Shelbourne and Derry City, staged at Tolka Park during the 1996–97 season. In 2015, the club announced a future move as co-tenants of Dublin City Council-owned Dalymount Park once redevelopment was completed around 2020. In 2021, the redevelopment was planned to conclude by 2025.

In February 2022, the council agreed to examine a proposal for the club to repurchase Tolka Park.

Supporters and rivalries
The club's fanbase is mainly drawn from the northside of Dublin although there are a number of supporters from the Southside, mainly the Ringsend area where the club originates from.

'Briogáid Dearg' (Red Brigade) was formed in 2003 and is the club's single Ultras group. 'Reds Independent' are a Shelbourne supporters group formed in 1998 after Shelbourne FC moved their home UEFA Cup tie with Rangers out of the country and to Prenton Park, the home of Tranmere Rovers FC. The group gives Shelbourne fans an independent voice, through Red Inc., the longest-running fanzine in the League of Ireland. Red Inc. was first sold as a sixteen-page publication priced fifty pence for a home league tie against Cork City on 31 January 1999. The 'Shelbourne Supporters' Development Group' was founded in 2006 with the aim of securing badly needed funding from the Shelbourne supporter base. The Group have been promised shares in Shelbourne FC Ltd and representation on the board if it raises a certain amount of money for Shelbourne FC each year.

In October 2012 a Shelbourne FC Supporters' Trust was agreed to be launched by fans. The Trust's name was officially voted as "The 1895 Trust" in celebration of the founding year of the club. The Trust was officially launched in 2013.

Shelbourne shares a rivalry with Bohemians largely because of geographical proximity as both clubs are now located roughly just one mile apart, and also because of their early days in the old Belfast-centered Irish League and the early Irish Free State league. The club also has rivalries with other Dublin sides St Patrick's Athletic and Shamrock Rovers.

European football

Shelbourne have a long, illustrious history in European competitions, taking on teams such as Kilmarnock, Sporting Lisbon, Barcelona, Atlético Madrid, Panathinaikos, Rangers, Rosenborg, Brøndby, Hajduk Split, Deportivo de La Coruña, Lille, and  Steaua Bucharest.

Shelbourne first performed on the European stage in the 1962/63 season, taking on Sporting Lisbon in the European Cup. From 1995 to 2006, Shelbourne had been ever-present in European competition and enjoyed a considerable amount of success. However, due to the club's recent decline, they are currently unranked in the UEFA Team Rankings and are without any club coefficient points.

Overview

Players

Out on loan

Technical staff

Club officials

Other staff

Notable former players

  Joseph Ledwidge (1901-1909)
  Nicky Broujos (1985-1986)

Notable former managers

  Peter Shevlin (1931–33)
  Val Harris (193?–??)
  John Feenan (1942–46)
  Alf Hanson (1946–47)
  Bob Thomas (1950–53)
  David Jack (1953–55)
  Eddie Gannon (1955–57)
  Gerry Doyle (1957–65)
  Con Martin (1965)
  Alvarito (1965)
  Gerry Doyle (1967–75)
  Tommy Carroll (1975–76)
  Mick Dalton (1978–79)
  Eric Barber (1979–80)
  Pat Dunne (1980–81)
  Freddie Strahan (1981)
  Frank O'Neill (1981)
  Liam Tuohy (1981–82)
  Jim McLaughlin (1983–86)
  Paddy Mulligan (1985–86)
  Pat Byrne (1988–93)
  Eoin Hand (1993–94)
  Eamonn Gregg (1994)
  Colin Murphy (1994–95)
  Damien Richardson (1995–98)
  Dermot Keely (1998–02)
  Pat Fenlon (2002–06)
  Dermot Keely (1 March 2007 – 27 May 2010)
  Colin O´Neill (interim) (28 May 2010 – 9 July 2010)
  Alan Mathews (12 July 2010 – 16 May 2013)
  Kevin Doherty (interim) (17 May 2013 – 23 May 2013)
  John McDonnell (24 May 2013 – 2014)
  Kevin Doherty (Dec 2014–June 2016)
  Owen Heary (June 2016 – October 2018)
  Ian Morris (November 2018 – October 2021)

Other teams

Women’s team

In 2015 Shelbourne Ladies merged with Raheny United's senior women's team. This effectively saw Shelbourne Ladies takeover Raheny United's place in the Women's National League. During the subsequent 2015–16 season, Shelbourne Ladies finished as runners-up in FAI Women's Cup, the WNL Shield and the Women's National League. All three competitions were won by Wexford Youths. However Shelbourne Ladies did win the WNL Cup after defeating UCD Waves 3–2 in the final at Richmond Park on 1 May 2016. In 2016 Shelbourne won the FAI Women's Cup after defeating Wexford Youths 5–0 in the final. The most notable individual performance to come out of the game was undoubtedly that of Shels' Leanne Kiernan, who scored a hat-trick and picked up the 'player of the match' award for her efforts.

The team won their first league championship when they finished the shortened 2016 season in first place. They qualified for the 2017–18 UEFA Women's Champions League with that title. In March 2019 Shelbourne announced a number of steps intended to boost "equality and parity of esteem for all of our players". They dropped the word Ladies from the women's team's name and moved WNL home games from the AUL Complex to the main stadium at Tolka Park. The WNL team are the current 2022 WNL Champions, and will also compete in the 2023 Women's Champions League qualifying rounds.

U-19 team
It was announced on 21 April 2011, by the Football Association of Ireland that there would be the formation of a League of Ireland U19 Division. This giving young players in Ireland the prospect of ultimately breaking into the first teams of League of Ireland clubs.

Schoolboys
Shelbourne have seventeen schoolboy teams competing in the Dublin & District Schoolboy Leagues. Schoolboy teams have participated in numerous Youth Cups worldwide including the Milk Cup and Umbro Galway Cup.They also have a new u13s league of Ireland sse airtricity schoolboy team.

Shelbourne are involved in a football scholarship programme with Larkin Community College, on Dublin's northside. This scheme is considered to have helped stop the falling enrolment rates, and early leaving of school, in part of Dublin's north inner city.

Amateur team
Shelbourne also has an amateur team playing in the United Churches Football League, Division 1. However, the team started in the Amateur Football League Division 2. They won promotion to Division 1 in 2008 and earned a place in the Premier Division a year later following a playoff victory against Columba Rovers.
In 2013 they won the Premier Division with two games to spare.
In 2014 the team had silverware again. This time it was the Maher Cup after a 1:0 victory in the final.
2015 saw the team move away from the Amateur Football League to the United Churches Football League, where it remains to date.

Reserve team
The Shelbourne A team took part in the 2010 A Championship and finished sixth in Group 1. The team did not participate in the 2011 edition of the Championship, which was the last edition of the competition.

Honours
 League of Ireland/Premier Division 13:
 1925–26, 1928–29, 1930–31, 1943–44, 1946–47, 1952–53, 1961–62, 1991–92, 1999–2000, 2001–02, 2003, 2004, 2006
 League of Ireland First Division 2:
 2019, 2021
 Irish Cup: 3
 1905–06, 1910–11, 1919–20
 FAI Cup: 7
 1938–39, 1959–60, 1962–63, 1992–93, 1995–96, 1996–97, 1999–2000
 League of Ireland Cup: 1
 1995–96
 League of Ireland Shield: 8
 1921–22, 1922–23, 1925–26, 1929–30, 1943–44, 1944–45, 1948–49, 1970–71
 LFA President's Cup: 8
 1929–30, 1939–40, 1947–48, 1960–61, 1993–94, 1995–96, 1998–99, 2002–03
 FAI Super Cup: 1
 2001–02
 Dublin City Cup: 4
 1941–42, 1946–47, 1962–63, 1964–65
 City Cup: 1
 1908–09
 Gold Cup: 1
 1914–15
 Top Four Cup: 1
 1961–62
 Leinster Senior League: 12 (record)
 1902–03, 1903–04, 1906–07, 1907–08, 1908–09, 1910–11, 1915–16, 1916–17, 1918–19, 1923–24, 1942–43, 1943–44
 Leinster Senior Cup: 21
 1899–1900, 1900–01, 1903–04, 1905–06, 1907–08, 1908–09, 1912–13, 1913–14, 1916–17, 1918–19  1923–24, 1930–31, 1945–46, 1948–49, 1962–63, 1967–68, 1971–72, 1993–94, 2010, 2017, 2018
 FAI Intermediate Cup: 1 1932–33
 Enda McGuill Cup: 1' 2003

Records

Results
 Biggest League Win:
 9–0 vs Pioneers, 16 December 1922
 9–0 vs Bray Unknowns, 4 September 1926
 Biggest League Defeat:
 0–9 vs Dundalk, 27 November 1980
 Biggest FAI Cup Win:
 9–0 vs Bray Unknowns, 6 January 1923
 Biggest European Win:
 single tie: 4–0 vs Vėtra home, 24 June 2006
 aggregate: 5–0 vs Vėtra, June 2006

Goals / scorers
 Most League goals in a season:
 72 (1922–23) Most League goals in a game:
 6, John Ledwidge vs Jacobs, 9–1 home, 10 October 1929
 6, Alex Hair vs Jacobs, 7–0 home, 6 September 1930
 Most FAI Cup goals in a game:
 5, Stephen Doyle vs Bray Unknowns 9–0 home, 6 January 1923
 Top League scorer:
 season:  29, Alex Hair, (1930–31) total:  126, Eric Barber, (1958–66), (1971–75), (1978–80) Top European scorer:
 season: 5, Jason Byrne, (2004–05) total: 8, Jason Byrne, (2003–06)International capsFull international caps won by players while with Shelbourne:  (IFA): 5 players capped
 First: Val Harris vs England home, 17 February 1906.
 Last: Ed Brookes vs Scotland away, 13 March 1920.
 Most: Val Harris (6), (1906–08).
  (FAI): 23 players capped
 First: Mick Foley and Fran Watters vs Italy away, 21 March 1926.
 Last: Jason Byrne vs Chile home, 24 May 2006.
 Most: Joe Haverty (7), (1965–66).

In popular culture
 The club appeared in the fictional football drama Dream Team'' when Harchester United were drawn to play "The Reds" in the UEFA Cup.

References

External links

 Official club website
 Reds Independent Independent Supporters' Group
 Shelbourne Supporters' Development Group
 The 1895 Trust
 ShelsTV.com IPTV Channel
 Shelshomepage & ShelsTV.com New Shelshomepage and ShelsTV.com website
 Shelbourne clear tax debt

 
Association football clubs established in 1895
Association football clubs in Dublin (city)
Former League of Ireland Premier Division clubs
Former senior Irish Football League clubs
1895 establishments in Ireland
League of Ireland First Division clubs
Former Leinster Senior League clubs
Former Athletic Union League (Dublin) clubs